The 1987 season was the 82nd season of competitive football in Norway.

Men's football

League season

Promotion and relegation

1. divisjon

For the first time in the Norwegian top flight, three rather than two points were given for wins. There was also another, more controversial new rule for points: if a match was drawn, two points would be given to the winner of a penalty shootout, and one point to the loser of the shootout. This rule, suggested by Tom A. Schanke and appointed by the Norwegian Football Association in February 1987, was highly controversial and liquidated after the 1987 season. Note that if draws would end as draws with one point to each, as usual, Tromsø IL would have been placed 10th with a possibility of being relegated.

Moss FK, coached by Nils Arne Eggen, won the league for the first and, as of the 2019 season, last time. The victory was not settled until the final round of the league, with Moss beating runners-up Molde FK (who would have grabbed the gold if they defeated Moss) 2–0 at away grounds.

2. divisjon

Group A

Group B

3. divisjon

Norwegian Cup

Final

Women's football

League season

1. divisjon

Norwegian Women's Cup

Final
Sprint/Jeløy 2–1 Klepp

UEFA competitions

European Cup

First round

|}

Second round

|}

European Cup Winners' Cup

First round

|}

UEFA Cup

First round

|}

National teams

Norway men's national football team

Results
Source:

Norway women's national football team

Results

References

External links
  Norge Menn Senior A, Football Association of Norway 1908–present
 RSSSF.no – National team 1987

 
Seasons in Norwegian football